Zhongdu is the pinyin romanization of the Chinese characters , meaning "Central Capital". It may refer to:

 Zhongdu, the capital of the Jurchen Jin Dynasty during the 12th century, located in present-day Beijing
 Zhongdu, the capital of the Mongol Yuan dynasty during the 14th century, ordered to be built by Külüg Khan (emperor Wuzong), located in Zhangbei County
 Zhongdu, a proposed capital for the new Ming Dynasty to be located at the birthplace of the Hongwu Emperor in Anhui

Zhongdu, written with other Chinese characters, is also used for other place names:
 Zhongdu, Luzhai County, a town in Luzhai County, Guangxi
 Zhongdu, Shanghang County, a town in Fujian
 Zhongdu, Xupu (中都乡),  a township of Xupu County, Hunan